is a Japanese video game developer headquartered in Kōtō, Tokyo. Its offices in Malaysia and Singapore, Bandai Namco Studio Malaysia and Bandai Namco Studios Singapore, are based out of Selangor, Malaysia and Infinite Studios, Singapore respectively. Bandai Namco Studios is a subsidiary of Bandai Namco Entertainment, which itself is a subsidiary of Bandai Namco Holdings. The company works under its parent company as a keiretsu; Bandai Namco Studios creates video games for home consoles, handheld systems, mobile devices and arcade hardware, while Bandai Namco Entertainment handles the managing, marketing and publishing of these products.

Bandai Namco Studios was established in April 2012 as the spin-off company of publisher Namco Bandai Games's video game development divisions. Originally known as Namco Bandai Studios Inc., the decision was based on its parent company's restructuring efforts and need for a decrease in development times and increase in productivity. Studios absorbed over 1,000 employees from Namco Bandai Games, and 80 employees from the defunct Namco Tales Studio division. The company opened divisions in Singapore and Vancouver in 2013 to expand operations overseas; the Vancouver division later closed in 2018. Its Malaysia division was established in 2016.

Bandai Namco Studios has worked on many successful video game franchises, including Tekken, Pac-Man, The Idolmaster, Ace Combat, Tales, and Soulcalibur, in addition to original intellectual properties such as Code Vein and Scarlet Nexus. Much like Namco developed games for Nintendo as a publisher since the GameCube, the company has also developed several games for them as Bandai Namco Studios, namely the Super Smash Bros. series beginning with the fourth installment, Wii Sports Club, and spin-offs in the Pokémon franchise like Pokkén Tournament and New Pokémon Snap. The company is a strong advocate of video game preservation, preserving master arts, design documents, and other resources for its games.

History

Established on March 31, 2006, Namco Bandai Games was the amalgamation of Namco and Bandai's video game development operations being merged and consolidated into one company. The developer produced the majority of its video games in-house, through its subsidiaries such as Banpresto and D3 Publisher, or lending production to external studios. However, as the company was recovering from financial losses and was undergoing a reorganization, Namco Bandai Games believed it was necessary to spin-off its game development operations into a separate division. The company requested for faster development times and healthy relations between its multiple business areas, and believed the formation of a new company would remedy this.

Namco Bandai's video game operations were transferred to a new subsidiary, Namco Bandai Studios Inc., on April 2, 2012.  Located in Shinagawa, Tokyo, the company was headed by company veteran Hajime Nakatani and became a wholly owned subsidiary of Namco Bandai Games. Its parent company stated that Studios would allow for faster development times, tighter cohesion with aligning production teams, and more creative freedom and developer skills for its employees. Namco Bandai's consecutive financial increases in its year-over-year profits also contributed to its establishment. Studios inherited 1,000 employees from Namco Bandai Games and all 80 staff members from the former Namco Tales Studio, which ceased operations a year earlier. It would focus on the development of new intellectual properties and follow-ups to established franchises, such as Tekken, Pac-Man, and Ace Combat. The two companies would work in conjunction with one another as a keiretsu, where Namco Bandai Studios would develop and plan games and Namco Bandai Games would handle marketing, publishing, and distribution.

Namco Bandai Studios opened two international divisions on March 1, 2013: Namco Bandai Studios Singapore Pte. Ltd. in Media Circle, Singapore, and Namco Bandai Studios Vancouver Inc. in Vancouver, Canada. The Singapore division was assigned as Namco Bandai's head video game development branch in Asia, and to establish working relationships with fellow developers in the region. The Vancouver division was to design online network games and provide content for North America and Europe, while simultaneously focusing on contributing to the country's growing game industry. Namco Bandai Studios Singapore employed several staff members from the Singapore division of Lucasarts, who had previously worked on the cancelled Star Wars 1313. Its Japanese division established a working relationship with Nintendo with Wii Sports Club, a high-definition remaster of the original Wii Sports (2006) for the Wii U; several Nintendo games to follow were developed by Bandai Namco Studios, including Super Smash Bros. for Nintendo 3DS and Wii U (2014), Pokkén Tournament (2015), Super Smash Bros. Ultimate (2018) and New Pokémon Snap (2021).

On April 1, 2014, Namco Bandai Studios was renamed Bandai Namco Studios Inc., following an effort by its parent company to unify the Bandai Namco brand across its international divisions. The company began development on virtual reality arcade games the same month, which were designed for Bandai Namco Entertainment's VR Zone chain of video arcades. In 2016, Bandai Namco Studios released Summer Lesson, a virtual reality game designed for the PlayStation VR headset. The Vancouver division closed on November 16, 2018, though a "skeleton crew" was kept to support Tekken Mobile, and opened a Malaysia division in 2016. Bandai Namco Studios won the "Grand Prize" award at the Japan Game Awards for its work on Super Smash Bros. Ultimate, as well as the "Japan Game Awards 2019  Minister of Economy, Trade and Industry Award" from the organization.

Staff and design philosophy
Bandai Namco Studios identifies itself as the successor to Namco, focusing on its predecessor's design philosophies and corporate environment. The company emphasizes creating unique and immersive experiences in games, and is against copying ideas from other developers. Many of its employees were originally employed at Namco:

 Daisuke Uchiyama – President and CEO. Producer for many of Bandai Namco's anime fighting games, particularly those from the Dragon Ball series.
 Shigeru Yokoyama – Company chairman. Designer of Galaga and Splatterhouse, and supervisor of franchises such as Xenosaga.
 Kazutoki Kono – Head of Project Aces, the internal development team behind the Ace Combat series.
 Minoru Sashida – Manager of the master art preservation program. Artist for the Mr. Driller series, Techno Drive, and Ace Combat 3: Electrosphere.

Bandai Namco Studios is a strong advocate of video game preservation. In particular, it sees the master art used for supplementary material in games, such as Galaxian (1979) and Pac-Man (1980), as being of historical importance; the company believes preserving these master arts allows for further appreciation of its predecessor's games as well as the arts themselves. Studios has amassed a collection of 400 master arts, including those from Xevious (1983), Ridge Racer (1993), and J-League Soccer Prime Goal (1993), which it stores in an internal department named the "Banarchive". Many of its pieces were originally deemed lost during its move to Kōtō in 2015, though most have since been recovered. Bandai Namco Studios hopes to easily share its master arts to the public in the form of YouTube retrospective videos and a virtual reality museum through its Namco Museum of Art project.

In addition to its master arts, Bandai Namco Studios has also preserved promotional pamphlets, source code, master models for characters, design documentation, and release dates for all video games by Namco, Bandai, and Banpresto. Other divisions within Bandai Namco Holdings and external companies have used these arts for products such as apparel and posters. Hisaharu Tago, the producer of the Nintendo Switch release of Namco Museum, hopes the company will be able to bring the entirety of Namco's back catalog for modern gaming platforms.

Games

Notes

References

External links

Bandai Namco Holdings subsidiaries
Japanese companies established in 2012
Software companies based in Tokyo
Video game companies established in 2012
Video game companies of Japan
Video game development companies